Slow Motion is the ninth album by the Welsh rock band Man and was released on the United Artists Records label. It was the only album recorded by this line-up, Malcolm Morley (guitar, keyboards, vocals) having left the day before recording was due to start. He was not replaced, so the album was recorded by the remaining four members. Unlike the previous and subsequent albums (Rhinos, Winos and Lunatics and The Welsh Connection) Slow Motion failed to make the UK top 40 album chart.

The album title was chosen to challenge sleeve designer Rick Griffin, who painted Alfred E. Neuman shaking a fish, but Mad magazine objected, so the final image concentrated on the fish. The band name "Man" was also written in a font resembling the Mad logo.

Track listing 
All songs composed by Micky Jones, Deke Leonard, Ken Whaley and Terry Williams.

Release history 
Original LP released on United Artists in 1974 - Catalogue Nos UAG 29675 (UK) and LA 345G (US)
Released as CD on Beat Goes On Records (BGO Records) in 1993 - Catalogue Nos BGOCD 209 (UK) and BGT 209 (US)
Remixed and re-issued with bonus tracks on Esoteric Recordings in 2008 - Catalogue No ECLEC 2062

For information about releases in other countries, singles, cassettes, 8 track cartridges etc., see The Manband Archive

Personnel 
 Micky Jones – guitar, vocals
 Deke Leonard – guitar, vocals
 Ken Whaley – bass
 Terry Williams – drums, vocals

Credits 
 Producer – Man and Anton Matthews
 Production & Special Assistance – David Charles
 Design – Rick Griffin
 Liner Notes – Michael Heatley
 Mixing – Robin Black, David Hamilton-Smith, David Charles, Anton Matthews
 Strings – Stuart Gordon
 Saxophone – Chris Mercer

References

External links 
 Man - Slow Motion (1974) album review by Paul Collins, credits & releases at AllMusic.com
 Man - Slow Motion (1974) album releases & credits at Discogs.com
 Man - Slow Motion (1974) album credits & user reviews at ProgArchives.com
 Man - Slow Motion (1974) album to be listened as stream at Spotify.com

1974 albums
Man (band) albums
United Artists Records albums
Albums with cover art by Rick Griffin
Albums recorded at Rockfield Studios